Cameron Jordan Johnson (born March 3, 1996) is an American professional basketball player for the Brooklyn Nets of the National Basketball Association (NBA). He played college basketball for the Pittsburgh Panthers and the North Carolina Tar Heels. Drafted by the Minnesota Timberwolves with the eleventh overall pick in the 2019 NBA draft, Johnson was traded to the Phoenix Suns on draft night. During his sophomore season, he reached the 2021 NBA Finals with the Suns.

High school career
As a junior in high school, Johnson was a 6-foot-2 point guard before having a growth spurt. He graduated from Our Lady of the Sacred Heart. As a senior at OLSH, Johnson averaged 27.8 points, eight rebounds and five assists per game. He finished his career with 1,175 points. He signed with Pittsburgh in April 2014.

College career

Pittsburgh (2014–2017)
Johnson suffered a shoulder injury shortly into his first year at Pittsburgh and was allowed to redshirt during that season in order to undergo rehabilitation for his injury.  He was used as a substitute during his redshirt freshman year. As a redshirt sophomore at Pitt, Johnson averaged 11.9 points per game and hit 41.5% of his three-point attempts. Johnson graduated from Pittsburgh with a degree in communications in three years. He took advantage of the graduate transfer rule and moved to North Carolina without sitting out a year. The University of Pittsburgh initially refused to allow his release to their in-conference rival Tar Heels but eventually relented. He cited uncertainty in coaching and a losing record as factors in his decision to transfer.

North Carolina (2017–2019)
On November 15, 2017, five days after his team's season opener, Johnson had surgery to fix a torn meniscus. Johnson ended up sitting out ten games. Although hindered by the injury, Johnson finished third on the team in scoring with 12.4 points per game as well as grabbing 4.7 rebounds per game in his redshirt junior season. Johnson scored a career-high 32 points against Clemson. After the season, Johnson underwent an arthroscopic hip procedure and announced his intention to return to North Carolina for his senior season.

Johnson's senior season proved to be his most statistically successful campaign. Unhindered by injury, Johnson was the leading scorer for the Tar Heels with 16.9 points per game and averaged 5.8 rebounds and 2.4 assists. Johnson shot 50.6 percent from the field and 45.7 percent from three, leading some commentators to call Johnson "the best shooter in [the] draft." Johnson had several notable performances during his senior season. Playing against Wake Forest in Winston-Salem, Johnson shot 79% from the field for the game and made his first six three-point attempts, ultimately finishing with 27 points in a 95–57 rout of the Demon Deacons. Against rival Duke in Cameron Indoor Stadium, Johnson finished with 26 points in an 88–72 victory against the Blue Devils, then the nation's top-ranked team. Against Clemson in Littlejohn Coliseum, Johnson made six three-pointers to finish with 19 points in a two-point victory. After the conclusion of conference play, Johnson was named to the All-ACC first team.

Professional career

Phoenix Suns (2019–2023)
On June 20, 2019, the Minnesota Timberwolves drafted Johnson with the eleventh overall pick in the 2019 NBA draft, then immediately traded him and Dario Šarić to the Phoenix Suns for Jarrett Culver, the sixth pick of the draft. The trade was officially completed on July 6, with the Suns later announcing that they had signed Johnson the same day. On October 26, 2019, Johnson made his NBA debut coming off the bench in a 130–122 win over the Los Angeles Clippers. On November 19, he scored a season-high 18 points in a 120–116 loss to the Sacramento Kings. Johnson then matched his season-high on December 5 in a 139–132 overtime win over the New Orleans Pelicans.

Johnson his first professional start with the team on February 10, 2020, against the Los Angeles Lakers. On March 3, 2020, Johnson scored a new season-high of 21 points on his 24th birthday in a 123–114 loss to the defending champion Toronto Raptors. After originally being out for the rest of March due to illness, Johnson returned to action as a starter on July 31, scoring 12 points in a 125–112 win over the Washington Wizards. Two days later, Johnson had his first professional double-double with 19 points and a season-high 12 rebounds in a 117–115 win over the Dallas Mavericks. He later recorded his second double-double of his rookie season on August 6, matching his season-high 12 rebounds with 14 points scored in a 114–99 win over the Indiana Pacers. Two days later, Johnson broke the franchise record previously set by Wesley Person for the quickest player to score at least 100 three-pointers in a 119–112 win over the Miami Heat, reaching it in only 54 games played. With Johnson starting for Phoenix, the Suns would have an 8–0 record in the 2020 NBA Bubble as of August 13, having a winning streak of at least 7 games for the first time since March 2010.

On December 27, 2020, Johnson matched his then career-high of 21 points off the bench in a 116–100 win over the Sacramento Kings. Johnson helped the Suns reach the 2021 NBA Finals, but the Suns lost the series in 6 games to the Milwaukee Bucks.

On March 4, 2022, Johnson put up a career-high 38 points with nine three-pointers made alongside a game-winning, buzzer-beating three-pointer in a 115–114 win over the New York Knicks. He finished third in NBA Sixth Man of the Year voting, behind winner Tyler Herro and Kevin Love.

To start the 2022–23 season, Johnson was named the starting power forward for the Suns by head coach Monty Williams. On November 8, 2022, Johnson underwent surgery to remove part of the meniscus in his right knee and was ruled out for at least one to two months.

Brooklyn Nets (2023–present)
On February 9, 2023, the Suns traded Johnson to the Brooklyn Nets, along with Mikal Bridges, Jae Crowder, four unprotected first-round picks, and a 2028 first-round pick swap, in exchange for Kevin Durant and T. J. Warren. Johnson made his Nets debut two days later, recording 12 points, seven rebounds, seven assists and three steals in a 101–98 loss to the Philadelphia 76ers.

Career statistics

NBA

Regular season

|-
| style="text-align:left;"|
| style="text-align:left;"|Phoenix
| 57 || 9 || 22.0 || .435 || .390 || .807 || 3.3 || 1.2 || .6 || .4 || 8.8
|-
| style="text-align:left;"|
| style="text-align:left;"|Phoenix
| 60 || 11 || 24.0 || .420 || .349 || .847 || 3.3 || 1.4 || .6 || .3 || 9.6
|-
| style="text-align:left;"|
| style="text-align:left;"|Phoenix
| 66 || 16 || 26.2 || .460 || .425 || .860 || 4.1 || 1.5 || .9 || .2 || 12.5
|-
| style="text-align:left;"|
| style="text-align:left;"|Phoenix
| 17 || 16 || 25.2 || .474 || .455 || .818 || 3.8 || 1.5 || .9 || .4 || 13.9
|- class="sortbottom"
| style="text-align:center;" colspan="2"|Career
| 200 || 52 || 24.3 || .444 || .396 || .840 || 3.6 || 1.4 || .7 || .3 || 10.7

Playoffs

|-
| style="text-align:left;"| 2021
| style="text-align:left;"| Phoenix
| 21 || 0 || 21.1 || .500 || .446 || .906 || 3.1 || .8 || .9 || .2 || 8.2
|-
| style="text-align:left;"| 2022
| style="text-align:left;"| Phoenix
| 13 || 3 || 24.6 || .465 || .373 || .813 || 3.5 || 1.5 || .4 || .1 || 10.8
|- class="sortbottom"
| style="text-align:center;" colspan="2"|Career
| 34 || 3 || 22.4 || .483 || .414 || .859 || 3.3 || 1.1 || .7 || .1 || 9.2

College

|-
| style="text-align:left;"| 2014–15
| style="text-align:left;"| Pittsburgh
| 8 || 0 || 14.4 || .394 || .348 || .500 || 1.1 || .5 || .1 || .4 || 4.5
|-
| style="text-align:left;"| 2015–16
| style="text-align:left;"| Pittsburgh
| 32 || 1 || 11.7 || .397 || .375 || .808 || 1.8 || .5 || .3 || .2 || 4.8
|-
| style="text-align:left;"| 2016–17
| style="text-align:left;"| Pittsburgh
| 33 || 33 || 33.3 || .447 || .415 || .811 || 4.5 || 2.3 || .9 || .3 || 11.9
|-
| style="text-align:left;"| 2017–18
| style="text-align:left;"| North Carolina
| 26 || 20 || 29.3 || .426 || .341 || .847 || 4.7 || 2.3 || .7 || .2 || 12.4
|-
| style="text-align:left;"| 2018–19
| style="text-align:left;"| North Carolina
| 36 || 36 || 29.9 || .505 || .457 || .818 || 5.8 || 2.4 || 1.2  || .3 || 16.9
|- class="sortbottom"
| style="text-align:center;" colspan="2"| Career
| 135 || 90 || 25.4 || .456 || .405 || .817 || 4.1 || 1.8 || .8 || .3 || 11.2

Personal life
Johnson is a Christian. When the national anthem is played before games, he recites Psalm 23. He also wears the jersey number 23 in part because of Psalm 23.

Johnson’s brother, Donovan “Puff” Johnson, plays basketball for the North Carolina Tar Heels. Johnson's mother, a Croatian American, is a school nurse. This inspired Johnson to give out special appreciation to the healthcare workers and their families on their February 7, 2021 home game against the Boston Celtics, the Suns' first home game since March 8, 2020 to have fans enter their arena after dealing with the COVID-19 pandemic.

References

External links

North Carolina Tar Heels bio
Pittsburgh Panthers bio

1996 births
Living people
American men's basketball players
American people of Croatian descent
Basketball players from Pennsylvania
Brooklyn Nets players
Minnesota Timberwolves draft picks
North Carolina Tar Heels men's basketball players
People from Moon Township, Allegheny County, Pennsylvania
Phoenix Suns players
Pittsburgh Panthers men's basketball players
Small forwards
Sportspeople from the Pittsburgh metropolitan area